The Tomb of the Haterii is an Ancient Roman funerary monument, constructed between  and  along the Via Labicana to the south-east of Rome. It was discovered in 1848 and is particularly noted for the numerous artworks, particularly reliefs, found within.

The tomb was primarily dedicated to Hateria, a freedwoman and priestess, and her husband Quintus Haterius, who was involved in the construction of public monuments. Inscriptions within the tomb also commemorate four of the couple's children, as well as other members of their gens.

The tomb was originally rediscovered in 1848, and partially excavated, with many of its sculptures removed and put on display in the Vatican Museums. Its location was subsequently forgotten until 1970, when a further round of excavations uncovered more of the tomb's lower storey, as well as further works of sculpture.

The Gens Hateria 

The gens Hateria was a Roman plebeian family. Originally enslaved, they became notable from the later 1st century BCE: Cicero mentions a jurist of the gens in a letter of 46 BCE, and another is mentioned as a victim of the proscriptions of 43 BCE. 

The fragmentary titulus (founding inscription) names Quintus Haterius, of uncertain cognomen, and his wife Hateria as the founders of the tomb. The inscription indicates that at least Hateria was a former slave, and that Haterius was either a former slave of the same household or the former master of Hateria, who freed her in order to marry her. The titulus also dedicates the tomb to Quintus Haterius Rufio, either a close relative or former owner of Haterius and Hateria.

Smaller inscriptions beneath the titulus commemorate Quintus Haterius Rufinus and Quintus Haterius Anicetus, sons of Quintus, and two daughters, Hateria Magna and Hateria Quintilla, who are recorded as having died before marriage. All four children's names are recorded with filiations, indicating that they were born free, and so after Hateria's manumission. Other inscriptions found in the tomb mention Quintus Haterius Antigonus and Hateria Supera, who died at the age of five.

Filippo Coarelli has argued for an identification between the Quintus Haterius of the founding inscription and Quintus Haterius Tychichus, a freedman and redemptor (building contractor) known from another inscription. However, since the cognomen of the tomb's founder has been lost from the titulus, the identification cannot be securely proven, though several of the reliefs allude to the deceased's involvement in public building.

The tomb is not associated with the orator Quintus Haterius, also of the gens Hateria, who died in 26 BCE: his tomb, consisting of a funerary altar covered in travertine and decorated with marble, was near the Porta Nomentana. Barbara Borg has, however, suggested that the Haterii of this tomb were freedmen of Quintus Haterius' grandson, Quintus Haterius Antoninus, which gave them a close relationship with the imperial family. They may have been involved in the construction of the Templum Gentis Flaviae, constructed by Domitian, which seems to have served as an inspiration for the construction of temple-shaped tombs such as that of the Haterii.

Tomb 

The tomb was heavily damaged at the time of rediscovery. It was a mausoleum in the approximate shape of a temple, standing on two storeys, the upper of which was originally accessed by a staircase. The tomb was decorated with various marble reliefs. The part of the lower storey excavated in 1970 consisted of a semi-interred burial chamber measuring 3.5 × 3.5 m. This chamber, which was originally accessible from ground level, included marble flooring, marble cladding on the walls, and marble mouldings at their base. Originally, the tomb included a garden, in which were found a puteal and a sculpture of a cow, and which is believed to have been the original location of a statue of Silvanus, parts of which were found to the south of the tomb in 1970.

One of the tomb reliefs, known as the Tomb-Crane Relief, shows the construction of a temple-shaped funerary monument, with sculptural busts in niches along the outside and reliefs covering the walls. A deceased man appears on a couch above the temple, already in the afterlife. While the tomb shown in this relief is larger than the Tomb of the Haterii, and the decoration does not match that found within the tomb, it has been taken as a 'heightened, elaborated vision' of the tomb or of its type. 

No direct evidence of burials was found in the tomb, particularly graves or sarcophagi, leading to the conclusion that the burials here were cremation burials placed into urns which are now mostly lost. During either late antiquity or the Medieval period, the tomb was rebuilt at least once.

Artworks 

The best known of the preserved reliefs consists of an elongated rectangular space showing a series of five buildings, identified by inscriptions, generally believed to represent public monuments on which the founding Quintus Haterius had worked. The monuments are, from left to right:

 Arcus ad Isis ('Arch at the temple of Isis'), generally interpreted as either part of or near the Temple of Isis and Serapis on the Campus Martius.
 The Colosseum (at this stage, without the attic above the three tiers of arches).
 An arch without an inscription.
 Arcus in sacra via summa ('Arch at the top of the Via Sacra'''), generally identified with the Arch of Titus. 
 A hexastyle temple (with six columns) and with a pediment surmounted by an attic, dedicated to Jupiter.

Apart from the Tomb-Crane Relief, another relief shows a funerary scene with a deceased woman lying on a bed, surrounded by four candelabra with burning flames and a small flaming vessel, possibly an acerra used to burn incense. Around the bed, two mourners accompany a woman with a crown, a flute-player and small figures of slaves. This is one of the few extant reliefs of lying in repose, or collocatio, known from the Roman world. Several newly-liberated freedmen, wearing the pileus, are shown sitting around the funeral bed and working on the crane.

Alongside the reliefs, two portraits inside a brick aedicula were found, along with an architrave with the busts of Mercury, Ceres, Proserpina and Pluto. These figures have been interpreted as equivalent to the Theoi Megaloi worshipped by the mystery cult of Samothrace, and in turn as tentative evidence for the spread of this cult to Rome. Another sculpture shows a child in the pose of Hercules, while a nude portrait of Venus has been interpreted as a portrait, perhaps of Hateria.

Other artworks perhaps associated with the tomb include a cinerary urn with a marine scene, a small pillar and a jamb decorated with vine shoots and grape harvest scenes, and another small pillar decorated on two sides by a candlestick adorned with roses and birds.

Another now-lost relief, showing a priestess of Dis Pater by the name Hateria, is generally considered to have come from the tomb and to be identified with the Hateria mentioned in the titulus.

 Excavations 

The tomb was first rediscovered during roadworks in 1848. At this point, an ancient wall and several pieces of sculpture, including the crane relief, were discovered, with at least some of the reliefs still in situ. During the Risorgimento, excavation on the tomb ceased, and its location was lost, with no detailed records having been made of the excavations to date or the find-spots of the material.

Most of the then-discovered sculptures were sold to the Vatican Museums in 1853.

The tomb was rediscovered in 1970, during further roadworks, and excavated over three days. During this excavation, part of the lower storey was uncovered as well as additional sculptural finds, including the titulus''.

Footnotes

Explanatory notes

References

Bibliography 

 
 
 
 
 .
 
 
 
 
 

Ancient Roman tombs and cemeteries in Rome
Archaeological discoveries in Italy
Latin inscriptions
Haterii